The Indonesian Army ( (TNI-AD)) is the land branch of the Indonesian National Armed Forces. It has an estimated strength of 300,000 active personnel.

Since the nation's independence movement, the Indonesian Army has been involved in multifaceted operations ranging from the incorporation of Western New Guinea, the Indonesia-Malaysia Confrontation, to the annexation of East Timor, as well as internal counter-insurgency operations in Aceh, Maluku, and Papua. The army's operations have not been without controversy; it has been periodically associated with human rights violations, particularly in West Papua, East Timor and Aceh.

The Indonesia Army is composed of a headquarters, 15 military regional command (Kodam), a strategic reserve command (Kostrad), a special forces command (Kopassus), and various adjunct units. It is headed by the Chief of Staff of the Army (Kepala Staf Angkatan Darat – KSAD or KASAD).

History

Formation
In the week following the Japanese surrender of 1945, the Giyūgun (PETA) and Heiho groups were disbanded by the Japanese. Most PETA and Heiho members did not yet know about the declaration of independence. Command structures and membership vital for a national army were consequently dismantled. Thus, rather than being formed from a trained, armed, and organised army, the Republican armed forces began to grow in September from usually younger, less trained groups under the national People's Security Agency built around charismatic leaders in the regions. Creating a rational military structure that was obedient to central authority from such disorganisation, was one of the major problems of the revolution, a problem that remains through to contemporary times. In a meeting between former KNIL and former PETA Division Commanders, organised by chief of staff (KSO) of People's Security Agency, Oerip Soemohardjo, a thirty-year-old former school teacher and PETA member, Sudirman, was elected 'commander-in-chief' in Yogyakarta on 12 November 1945.

Aware of the limitations of the military in the face of the Dutch aggression, the people and government of Indonesia had no choice but to fight foreign threats to the young nation's independence. Thus, in 1947, the People's War Doctrine in which all the power of the national armed forces and the community and resources were deployed to confront the Dutch aggression, was officially implemented within the army and the wider armed forces as the national military strategy. Thus, the integrity and existence of the Unitary Republic of Indonesia has been able to be maintained by military force with the people. By 1947, the young Army (then named Tentara Republik Indonesia - Angkatan Darat) was organized into 10 infantry divisions, 7 Javanese and 3 Sumatran.

In accordance with the decision of the Round Table Conference (RTC), at the end of 1949 the United States of Indonesia (RIS) came into being. Correspondingly, the TNI's ground forces thus formed part of the Angkatan Perang Republik Indonesia Serikat (APRIS) (later the Angkatan Perang Republik Indonesia or APRI when the republic became unitary in 1950). It would be the merger of the TNI and the former KNIL and all military personnel of the two forces, plus the independent paramilitary groups (laskar) which fought the war on the side of the independence movement.

Action against rebellions

The period is also called the period of liberal democracy is characterized by various rebellions in the country. In 1950 most of the former members of the Colonial Army launched an uprising in Bandung which is known as the Legion of Ratu Adil / APRA uprising and was led by former KNIL officer Raymond Westerling. The army also needed to confront the uprising in Makassar led by Andi Azis and the Republic of South Maluku (RMS) in Maluku. Meanwhile, DaruI Islam in West Java widened its influence to South Kalimantan, South Sulawesi and Aceh. In 1958 the Revolutionary Government of the Republic of Indonesia / People's Struggle (PRRI / Permesta) started a rebellion in large parts of Sumatra and North Sulawesi endangering the national integrity. As part of the National Armed Forces the Army helped defeat all these uprisings, increasing its prestige in the eyes of the government and the people. Future Chief of Staff of the Army Ahmad Yani was instrumental in one of these first victories against rebels in Central Java.

On 17 November 1952, General Nasution was suspended as army chief of staff following army indiscipline over command and support that threatens the government. From the 1950s, the military articulated the doctrines of dwifungsi and hankamrata, the military roles in the country's socio-political development as well as security; and a requirement that the resources of the people be at the call of the armed forces and police if the State warrants it. On 5 July 1959, Sukarno, with armed forces support and the advice of Nasution, issued a decree dissolving the Constituent Assembly and reintroducing the Constitution of 1945 with strong presidential powers. By 1963, he also assumed the additional role of Prime Minister, which completed the structure of 'Guided Democracy', and was named "President for Life", also with army assistance, the year after.

At the same time, the Indonesian government started sending their troops on UN peacekeeping missions. The first batch of soldiers were sent to Sinai, Egypt and were known as Garuda Contingent 1. Garuda Contingent I began its first deployment January 8, 1957 to Egypt. Garuda Contingent I consisted of the combined personnel of the 15th Army Infantry Regiment Territorial Command (TT) IV / Diponegoro, as well as one company of the 18th Infantry Regiment TC V / Brawijaya in Malang. This contingent was led by Lt. Col. of Infantry Hartoyo which was later replaced by Lieutenant Colonel of Infantry Suadi Suromihardjo, while his deputy was Major of Infantry Soediono Suryantoro. The contingent departed on January 8, 1957, on board the Douglas C-124 Globemaster II transport aircraft of the United States Air Force for Beirut, the Lebanese capital. From Beirut the contingent was divided by two, the majority heading to Abu Suweir and partly to Al Sandhira. Furthermore, the El Sandhira troops moved into Gaza, the border area of Egypt and Israel, while the command is in Rafah. This contingent returned to Indonesia on September 29, 1957. Garuda Contingent I had a total number of 559 army personnel of all ranks.

1960 onwards

The army was heavily involved in the Indonesian killings of 1965–1966. The killings were an anti-communist purge following a failed coup of the 30 September Movement. The most widely accepted estimates are that more than 500,000 people were killed. The purge was a pivotal event in the transition to the "New Order"; the Indonesian Communist Party (PKI) was eliminated as a political force. The failed coup released pent-up communal hatreds which were fanned by the Indonesian Army, which quickly blamed the PKI. Communists were purged from political, social, and military life, and the PKI itself was banned. The massacres began in October 1965, in the weeks following the coup attempt, and reached their peak over the remainder of the year before subsiding in the early months of 1966. They started in the capital, Jakarta, and spread to Central and East Java and, later, Bali. Thousands of local vigilantes and army units killed actual and alleged PKI members. Although killings occurred across Indonesia, the worst were in the PKI strongholds of Central Java, East Java, Bali, and northern Sumatra. It is possible that over one million people were imprisoned at one time or another.

Sukarno's balancing act of "Nasakom" (nationalism, religion and communism) had been unravelled. His most significant pillar of support, the PKI, had been effectively eliminated by the other two pillars—the army and political Islam; and the army was on the way to unchallenged power. In March 1968, Suharto was formally elected president.

The killings are skipped over in most Indonesian history books and have received little introspection by Indonesians and comparatively little international attention. Satisfactory explanations for the scale and frenzy of the violence have challenged scholars from all ideological perspectives. The possibility of a return to similar upheavals is cited as a factor in the "New Order" administration's political conservatism and tight control of the political system. Vigilance against a perceived communist threat remained a hallmark of Suharto's thirty-year presidency. The CIA described the massacre as "one of the worst mass murders of the 20th century, along with the Soviet purges of the 1930s, the Nazi mass murders during the Second World War, and the Maoist bloodbath of the early 1950s."

Later army operations have not been without controversy however. Involvement in UN Peacekeeping operations continued, but in 2010, the United Nations Interim Force in Lebanon was strongly criticized after two soldiers from Indonesia were filmed fleeing a clash on the Israeli-Lebanon border in a taxi.

The size of the Army has expanded over the years; in July 1976 the Army was estimated to consist of solely 180,000 personnel, one armoured cavalry brigade, part of Kostrad (one tank battalion, plus support units), 14 infantry brigades (90 infantry, 1 para, 9 artillery, 11 anti-aircraft, and 9 engineer battalions) of which three of the brigades were in Kostrad, two airborne brigades totalling six battalions, also part of Kostrad, one independent tank battalion, 7 independent armoured cavalry battalions, and four independent para-commando battalions.

Organisation

The Indonesian Army is currently organized into 15 military regions which are spread throughout the Indonesian archipelago. They are placed under the jurisdiction of the army headquarters. Three are based in Sumatra, four are based in Java, two are based in Kalimantan, one based in Lesser Sunda Islands, two based in Sulawesi, one based in Maluku and two based in Papua. The Komando Cadangan Strategis Angkatan Darat (Kostrad, strategic reserve forces) and Komando Pasukan Khusus (Kopassus, the Army special force) are independent formations and directly subordinate to the chief of staff. The army headquarters is under coordination with the armed force Headquarters. The highest-ranking officer within the army is the Chief of Staff of the Army which has the rank of a four-star General and is responsible to the Commander of the Armed Forces.

The Indonesian Army and its relation to the Armed Forces General Headquarters and the other military branches are structured into the following in accordance with the provisions of Presidential Regulation No. 66/ 2019 on the Organization of the Indonesian National Armed Forces:

Leadership elements 
 Chief of Staff of the Army, in charge of:
 heading the management and operational readiness of the Army;
 assisting the Commander of the Armed Forces in creating policies regarding the Army's image, doctrine, and strategy, as well as in preparing land-based operations;  
 assisting the Commander of the Armed Forces in utilizing various state defense components; and
 other land-based duties as ordered by the Commander of the Armed Forces.
 Deputy Chief of Staff of the Army, serving as the chief staff coordinator of the Army Headquarters, assisting the Army Chief of Staff in heading the Army.

Leadership support elements 
 Inspectorate General of the Army, tasked with general internal supervision of the Army, as well as the supervision over the Army's treasury and finance;
 Advisor to the Army Chief of Staff, tasked with providing the Army Chief of Staff with academic and scientific analysis over national and international issues;
 Army Planning and Budgeting Staff, tasked with drafting strategic policies and general administration of Army planning, budgeting, and bureaucratic reform;
 Army Intelligence Staff, tasked with drafting strategic policies and general administration of Army intelligence;
 Army Operational Staff tasked with drafting strategic policies and general administration of Army operations;
 Army Training Staff tasked with drafting strategic policies and general administration of Army training;
 Army Personnel Staff tasked with drafting strategic policies and general administration of Army personnel;
 Army Logistics Staff tasked with drafting strategic policies and general administration of Army logistics; and
 Army Territorial Staff tasked with drafting strategic policies and general administration of Army territorial affairs.

Service element  
 Army Headquarters Detachment, in charge of managing the internal affairs, personnel, logistics, and finance in support of the Army Headquarters.

Central executive agencies 
The following agencies are called Badan Pelaksana Pusat, translated as Central Executive Agencies, and directly subordinated under the Army Headquarters. Agencies with affix Pusat (Centers), Akademi (Academies), and Sekolah (Schools or Colleges) are headed by two-star Major General, while agencies with affix Dinas (Services/Departments) and Direktorat (Directorates) are headed by a one-star Brigadier General. Exceptions are made for the Army Territorial Forces Center, Army Military Police Center, and Army Central Hospital as they are all headed by a three-star Lieutenant General.

Centers
 Combat forces
 Infantry Forces Center
 Cavalry Forces Center
 Air Defense Artillery Forces Center
 Field Artillery Forces Center
 Combat and service support
 Army Territorial Forces Center
 Army Military Police Center
 Army Aviation Center
 Army Medical Center
 Army Combat Engineering Center
 Army Signals Center;
 Army Ordnance Center;
 Army Logistics and Transportation Center;
 Army Intelligence Center
 Army Ciphering and Cyber Operations Center

Central Hospitals

 Gatot Soebroto Army Central Hospital

Academies and Schools
 Indonesian Military Academy
 Army Command and General Staff College
 Army Officer Candidate School
Directorates
 Army Adjutancy General Directorate;
 Army Topography Directorate;
 Army Military Justice Directorate; and
 Army Finance Directorate.
Services
 Army Physical Fitness and Sport Service;
 Army Mental Guidance and Chaplaincy Service
 Army Psychology Service
 Army Research and Development Service
 Army Historical Heritage Service
 Army Information and Data Processing Service
 Army Public Relations Service
 Army Worthiness Service
 Army Procurement Service

Principal Commands under the Army Headquarters

Army Strategic Reserve Command 

The Army Strategic Reserve Command, better known by its abbreviation Kostrad is the Indonesian Army's strategic operational command. It is a corps-level command which has around 40,000 troops, organized into three divisions. It also supervises operational readiness among all commands and conducts defence and security operations at the strategic level in accordance with policies of the TNI commander. Green berets are worn by its personnel, and it is the main basic warfare combat unit of the Indonesian Army. 

While Kopassus is the elite-special forces of the Indonesian Army, Kostrad is still maintained as the first-line combat unit of the TNI below the Kopassus. Despite its nomenclature as reserve units, it is also used as main combat force, deployed for certain circumstances and is also capable for semi-special ops because mainly airborne infantry units are part of this corps. Kostrad contains Infantry (including Airborne) units, Artillery, Cavalry, and other military combat units. The three division's composition and its headquarters are:

Army Doctrine, Education and Training Development Command 
The Army Doctrine, Education and Training Development Command (abbreviated into Kodiklatad) is charged in providing training to all officers, warrant officers, NCOs and enlisted personnel of the Army. The Command HQ is based in Bandung, and organized into the following:

 Combat Operations Training Center
 Combat Simulation Center
 Army Branch Training Centers, which consist of the following Army training schools:
 Infantry Training Center
 Cavalry Training Center
 Air Defense Artillery Training Center
 Field Artillery Training Center;
 Women's Army Corps Training Center;
 Military Finance Training Center;
 Physical Fitness Training Center;
 Military Police Corps Training Center;
 Military Signals Training Center;
 Territorial Defense Training Center;
 Military Logistics and Transportation Corps Training Center
 Military Ordnance Training Center;
 Topography Training Center;
 Military Engineering Training Center;
 Military Medical Training Center
 Military Intelligence Training Center
 Adjutancy General Training Center
 Military Justice Training Center
 General Military Instruction Training Center
 Army Aviation Training Center
 Army Applied Technology College
 Indonesian Army Polytechnic
 Regional Training Regiments (abbreviated into Rindam) assigned to all fifteen territorial Regional Military Commands of the Army

Army Special Force Command 
The Special Force Command or Kopassus for short, composed of an estimated 5,530 personnel organized into five brigade-level groups:

 Group 1/Para Komando, based in Serang, composed of four airborne commando battalions (11th, 12th, 13th, and 14th)
 Group 2/Para Komando, based in Kartasura, composed of three airborne commando battalions (21st, 22nd, and 23rd)
 Group 3/Sandhi Yudha, based in Cijantung, Depok, composed of three battalions specialized in clandestine and intelligence operations (31st, 32nd, and 33rd) 
 SAT 81/Gultor, based in Cijantung, Depok, composed of two battalions specialized in counterterrorism (811th and 812th)
 Special Force Education and Training Center, based in Batujajar, West Bandung, composed of the following education and training units:
 Commando Training School;
 Airborne Training School;
 Combat Intelligence Training School;
 Specialization Training School;
 Raider Training School; and
 Special Combat Training School.

Except for the Special Force Education and Training Center, every Kopassus groups are tasked with maintaining its combat and operational readiness at any given moment. Each group is headed by a Colonel and all groups are qualified as airborne commandos. Kopassus is known for its roles in high-risk operations such as the Woyla hijacking and the Mapenduma hostage crisis. However, Kopassus is also known for its alleged human right abuses in East Timor and Papua. Personnel of the unit are distinguished by their red berets, similar to most paratrooper and special forces units in the world.

Army territorial commands 

The territorial Regional Military Command and its units below hierarchically serve as the main operational organization of the Indonesian Army. These military territories were established by General Sudirman (the then-Commander of the Indonesian National Armed Forces), following the model of the Nazi German Wehrkreis system. The system was later codified in Surat Perintah Siasat No.1, signed into doctrine in November 1948.

The hierarchy of Indonesian Army territorial command is as follows:
KODAM or Regional Military Command (Provincial or multiple province level) is commanded by a two-star Major General;
KOREM Military Area Command (Covering a province or multiple cities and regencies) is further divided into 2 type, A and B, commanded by a one-star Brigadier General and Colonel respectively;
KODIM Military District Command (City or Regency level) is further divided, into 3 type, independent, A and B, commanded by a Colonel, Lieutenant Colonel, and Major respectively; and
KORAMIL Military Sector Command (Kecamatan or district level) is further divided into 2 type, A and B, commanded by a Major and Captain respectively.

There are currently fifteen Kodams established across Indonesia, with all but two commands numbered.

 KODAM I/Bukit Barisan covers northern and central Sumatra, except Aceh
 KODAM II/ Sriwijaya covers southern Sumatra
 KODAM III/Siliwangi covered western Java, except Jakarta metro area
 KODAM IV/Diponegoro covered central Java
 KODAM V/Brawijaya covered eastern Java
 KODAM VI/Mulawarman covered eastern Kalimantan;
 KODAM IX/Udayana covered the lesser Sunda islands
 KODAM XII/Tanjungpura covered western and central Kalimantan
 KODAM XIII/Merdeka covered northern and eastern Sulawesi
 KODAM XIV/Hasanuddin covered southern and western Sulawesi
 KODAM XVI/Pattimura covered the Moluccas;
 KODAM XVII/Cenderawasih covered western Papua;
 KODAM VIII/Kasuari covered eastern Papua;
 KODAM Jayakarta covers Jakarta metro area
 KODAM Iskandar Muda covers Aceh

The Army's structure underwent various reorganizations throughout its early years. From 1946 to 1952 the Army was organized into a number of set combined arms divisions. These were further consolidated in 1951, and then dispersed in 1952.  From 1952 to 1958–59, the Army was organized into seven Territorial Armies (Tentara & Teritorium)  composed of regiments and independent formations in the battalion level and below. In August 1958, the Indonesian Army reconsolidated its territorial organization. There were then established sixteen regional commands, which retained earlier divisional titles; the Siliwangi Division, for example, became Kodam VI/Siliwangi. The RCs, then as in today, were subdivided administratively into Areas (the former territorial regiments), Districts (the former regimental battalions) and District Sectors, and operationally composed of a number of specialty battalions and in some regional commands, an infantry brigade.

A reorganisation in 1985 made significant changes in the army chain of command. The four multiservice Regional Defence Commands (Kowilhans) and the National Strategic Forces Command (Kostranas) were eliminated from the defence structure, re-establishing the Regional Military Command (Kodam) as the key organisation for strategic, tactical, and territorial operations for all services. The chain of command flowed directly from the ABRI commander in chief via the Chief of Staff of the Army to the ten territorial commands' commanders, and then to subordinate army territorial commands.

The territorial commands incorporate provincial and district commands each with a number of infantry battalions, sometimes a cavalry battalion, artillery, or engineers, and there are an increasing number of infantry brigades being activated. Some have Raider battalions attached either under divisional control, under brigades, or as territorial infantry.

Army Branches/Corps

Combat elements 

 Infantry branch (INF) - The Infantry Branch is the principal and major unit of the Indonesian army combat element. The Infantry element is the largest and main combat troops within the Indonesian army. Most members of Kostrad and Kopassus are composed of infantrymen, although it also consists of non-infantry units internally. In Indonesia, there are more than 100 Infantry Battalions spread throughout the country. Green berets are worn by Indonesian Army infantrymen. The Infantry Branch of the Indonesian Army are under the auspices of the Infantry Branch Center which is under the command of a lieutenant general. The Infantry branch of the Indonesian Army consists of huge numbers of units whereas the International Institute for Strategic Studies' Military Balance 2007 lists the Army with 2 brigades, (6 battalions), plus 60 other battalions in each Kodams and nine battalions in Kostrad. The elite infantry battalions of the Indonesian Army are called "Raider Battalions" (raised in 2003) which are specially trained in Raid and Air assault operations (including counter-terrorism, Extraction, Guerrilla and Close combat operations). By strength and capabilities, 1 battalion of Raider infantry is equal to 3 regular infantry battalions combined. There are currently about 39 raider battalions in the Indonesian Army Infantry branch, with the strength of 650 to 800 men per-battalion. It is larger compared to regular infantry battalions which only consists about 450 to 570 infantrymen. Even as the Army Chief of Staff is planning in the future to qualify all Infantry battalions (except mechanized) as "Raider"-ready, there are now mechanized battalions which are "Raider"-qualified in addition to their mechanized role. Infantry battalions in the Indonesian Army originates from different combat organisations or corps, there are several infantry battalions part of Kostrad and some are part of the territorial military commands, the same case also falls to Raider Infantry battalions. Currently, there are now 3 Airborne infantry brigades in the Indonesian Army which are all Raider qualified (thus named Para-raider), and are all part of the Kostrad corps. The Infantry beret colors of the Indonesian army are as shown below:
Regular Infantry soldiers wear Green Beret with crossed-rifle insignia 
Kostrad infantrymen wear Green Beret with Kostrad emblem (Airborne units are added a paratrooper wing insignia on the beret)
Raider infantrymen wear Dark Green beret with Raider bayonet emblem
Mechanized Infantrymen wear Dark Green beret with Mechanized Infantry emblem
There are today 5 types of Infantry battalions in the Indonesian Army, which are:
 Para-Raider Infantry Battalion (abbreviated Yonif Para Raider) are Airborne infantry battalions part of Kostrad which are also capable in Air assault and Raid operations.
 Mechanized-Raider Infantry Battalion (abbreviated Yonif Mekanis Raider) are Raider infantry battalions which are Mechanized that are special operations-capable which also can carry out urban warfare and ground mechanized infantry operations.
 Raider Infantry Battalion (abbreviated Yonif Raider) are infantry battalions which are basically trained for Raid warfare and Air assault operations. 
 Mechanized Infantry Battalion (abbreviated Yonif Mekanis) are mobilized infantry battalions, equipped with APCs and IFVs.
 Infantry Battalion (abbreviated Yonif) are light Infantry battalions.

All infantrymen of the Indonesian National Armed Forces have capabilities in Jungle warfare, including infantrymen from the Indonesian Marine Corps and Paskhas corps.

Combat support elements

 Cavalry (KAV) is the armored forces unit of the army. Its main function is as a combat support element. Cavalry units do not just rely on Tanks, APCs and IFVs as combat assets, but also use horses specially trained for combat and combat support operations in any terrain. Troopers wear black berets. The cavalry formations of the Army are under the supervision of the Cavalry Branch Center.

 Field Artillery (ARM) is the field artillery unit of the army. It also acts as a combat support similar to the cavalry unit. Its main function is to support ground combat mission for the Infantry Branch. Units of the Field Artillery use either towed or self propelled artillery guns and multiple rocket launchers. Brown berets are worn by its gunners. The Field Artillery units report under the Field Artillery Branch Center.

 Air Defense Artillery (ARH) are the anti-aircraft defense units of the army. Its main function to defend other ground units from an air attack and help to protect installations from destruction. They are equipped with both anti-air defense guns and short range air defense missile systems, either MANPADs or vehicle-mounted systems. Like the Field Artillery, Brown berets are worn by its gunners and missile crews. The Air Defense Artillery units report to the Air Defense Artillery Branch Center. Four detachments of missile artillery units called Den Rudal are part of the Air Defense Artillery.

Support elements
 Military Engineering Corps (CZI) - The Military Engineering Corps is specialty branch of the army whose primary function as a combat support, such as the construction of military bridges for vehicles to pass by or converting highways into temporary runways. Another function of this unit is to expand troop movements and narrowing enemy movements while assisting friendly units. The Military Engineers are also involved in relief operations in the aftermath of calamities and in building civil projects in the local communities. Engineers, regardless of rank, wear Grey berets or construction helmets in their uniforms. The unit is under the Directorate of Army Military Engineering.
 Ordnance Corps (CPL) is a unit whose main function is the maintenance and testing of military ordnance. The unit is under the Directorate of Army Ordnance .
 Signal Corps (CHB) is a unit whose main function to deliver and maintain the best possible information to combat units. The unit is under the Directorate of Army Signals.
Army Aviation Corps (CPN) - The army maintain its own small air arm that performs attack, liaison and transport duties. It operates 100 aircraft in five helicopter and aircraft squadrons composed mostly of light aircraft and small transports, such as the IPTN produced CN-235. Five squadrons are continuously maintained, as follow:
11th Squadron (light assault) based in Semarang
21st Squadron (support) based in West Jakarta
31st Squadron (heavy assault) based in Semarang
12th Squadron (light assault) based in Way Kanan
13th Squadron (support) based in Berau

Administrative Assistance Units

 Military Police Corps (CPM) is categorized as for the administration assistance unit. Its main function is to maintain of discipline, law and order within the entire Army. MP units wear either light blue berets which are dragged to the left or blue MP helmets. The Military Police is under the Army Military Police Command.
  Adjutant General's Corps (CAJ) function as the military, public and military civil servants affairs administration. The adjutant general unit is under the Directorate of Army Adjudant General.
 Logistics and Transportation Corps (CBA) is tasked to provide services and transport logistic cargo within the Indonesian Army. Dark blue berets are worn by its personnel. The Logistic Transportation Corps is under the Directorate of Army Logistics and Transportation.
 Topography Corps (CTP) This unit's main function is to make topographic research and maps about the battlefield for the purposes of the Indonesian Army during combat operations. This unit is under the Directorate of the Army Topography Service.
 Women's Army Corps (CWAD) Operationally dependent on Army commands and services the Women's Army Corps serves as the official administrative branch of women who actively spend their active military service in the ranks of the Army.
  Bandsmen Corps (CMU) - The Army Corps of Bandsmen, which is an administrative organization operationally dependent on Army commands and services, is responsible for the organization of the military bands, corps of drums and drum and bugle corps within the entire Army, alongside dedicated ensembles (big bands, rock and pop bands, native ensembles, etc.). Unlike the other support units, these are under the direct control of their respective unit commanders as HQ units and its overall supervision is under the Adjutant General of the Army. Bandsmen and field musicians wear the service dress berets or helmets of their reporting arm or branch of service.
 Medical Corps (CKM) This unit's main function is to maintain the health and medical wellness of all Army officers, warrant officers, NCOs and enlisted personnel. and their families. The health unit is under the Army Medical Department.
 Finance Corps (CKU) This unit's main function is to foster the financial administration of the army. The finance unit is under the Directorate of Army Finance.
 Military Justice Corps (CHK) This unit's main function is to maintain law and justice within the army. The law unit is under the command of Directorate of the Army Justice Service. This unit is also responsible for military courts, and military attorneys and judges report under this unit.

Chief of Staff of the Army

Rank structure

In the army, as well as in other armed forces branches in Indonesia, the rank consists of three group of ranks: Perwira for officers, Bintara for NCOs, and Tamtama for enlisted.

The proper title to address of rank are as follows and applicable to all branch of TNI, all flag officers (generals, admirals, and air marshals) use their rank followed by "(TNI)", while senior and junior officers use their rank followed by respective branch/corps abbreviation. For example, an Army colonel with Infantry branch use the title "Kolonel INF" (read as ), while an Army Major General from Infantry branch use the title "Mayor Jenderal (TNI)". Enlisted personnel are not required to put their respective branch/corps specialty.

Note: Indonesia is not a member of NATO, so there is not an official equivalence between the Indonesian military ranks and those defined by NATO. The displayed parallel is approximate and for illustration purposes only.

Officers

Enlisted

Equipment and weaponry

Photo gallery

See also

Ministry of Defence (Indonesia)
Indonesian Military Academy
Indonesian Navy
 Indonesian Marines
Indonesian Air Force

Notes

References

Bibliography
 
 Reid, Anthony. The Indonesian National Revolution 1945-1950. (Publisher: Longman Pty Ltd., Melbourne, 1974) .
 Ricklefs, M.C. A History of Modern Indonesia Since c. 1300. (Second Edition. MacMillan, 1991)

Further reading
Harold Crouch, The Army and Politics in Indonesia, Cornell University Press, Ithaca, New York, 1978
Sukarti Rinakit, The Indonesian Military after the New Order, Nordic Institute of Asian Studies, Copenhagen and Singapore, 2005

External links
 IndoWiki KODAMs
 Official website of TNI-AD (Army)
 Unofficial site of Indonesian Armed Forces
 Unofficial site of Indonesian Special Forces
 Jane's Intelligence Review - January 1997 and March 1997
 Indonesian Civil-Military Relations - Civil-Military Relations in Post-Suharto Indonesia and the Implications for Democracy Today: A Preliminary Analysis
Israel, Fauzi. Tactical Assault & Combat Training. 2008
"ASEAN Armies Rifle Meet"

 
Army
Military units and formations established in 1945